The 327th Air Division is an inactive air division of the United States Air Force (USAF).  It was assigned to Thirteenth Air Force throughout its existence. It was last stationed at Taipei Air Station in Gongguan, Taipei Taiwan, where it was inactivated on 7 January 1976.

The division was first active on Guam from 1957 to 1960.  At Guam it was responsible for the air defense of the Mariana Islands.

From 1966 to 1976, it was the administrative headquarters for all USAF units on Taiwan and supported other governmental agencies on the island.  It also coordinated with the Republic of China Air Force for the air defense of Taiwan.  The division, from 1966 through 1973, controlled an airlift wing that provided support for the Vietnam War.  The division was inactivated following the visit of President Richard Nixon to China and the subsequent gradually withdrawal of US military forces from Taiwan.

History

Air defense of Guam

The 327th Air Division was activated on 1 July 1957 at Andersen Air Force Base, Guam. It assumed responsibility for the air defense of the Mariana Islands and was also known as the Marianas Air Defense Division. To accomplish its mission, the division was assigned the 852d Aircraft Control and Warning Squadron, and the 41st Fighter-Interceptor Squadron. The 41st flew radar equipped North American F-86D Sabres, armed with Mighty Mouse rockets. In addition to Air Force training, these units also trained with naval organizations and participated in military exercises. The division and 41st Squadron were discontinued on 8 March 1960, while the 852d was inactivated in June.

USAF headquarters for Taiwan
The origins of the division's reactivation on Taiwan lie with Air Task Force 13 (Provisional). Air task forces had been active on Taiwan as early as 1955, under the command of then-Brigadier General Benjamin O. Davis, Jr.  General Davis was the vice commander of Thirteenth Air Force, and had the additional duty as commander of Air Task Force 13 when it was activated. The task force formed the air component of the United States Taiwan Defense Command.

On 8 February 1966, the division replaced the task force at Taipei Air Station, Taiwan and assumed responsibility for Air Force units on Taiwan.  The largest unit assigned to the division was the 314th Troop Carrier Wing, which had moved to Ching Chuan Kang Air Base, Taichung (commonly called "CCK") in January 1966 to augment airlift in the Pacific as part of the buildup of forces associated with the Vietnam War.  Initially, the wing was attached to the division administratively, remaining under the operational control of the 315th Air Division like other Lockheed C-130 Hercules units in the Pacific, but in November 1968 it was assigned to the 327th Division.  The 314th provided airlift throughout the Pacific, particularly combat airlift in Southeast Asia.

The 327th Air Division provided logistics, administrative and service support for military and United States government agencies on Taiwan. In addition, it coordinated air defense operations and plans with the Republic of China Air Force to integrate combined forces into the overall Pacific Command. In fulfilling its mission, the 327th participated in numerous military exercises.

In the spring of 1971 the 314th Wing moved on paper to Little Rock Air Force Base, where it replaced the 64th Tactical Airlift Wing. The 374th Tactical Airlift Wing, which had lost all its aircraft and become non-operational at Naha Air Base, Okinawa in April assumed the aircraft and personnel of the 314th and continued its airlift mission. In 1972, the 374th Wing participated in humanitarian missions following flooding in the Philippines and the following year supported Operation Homecoming, the repatriation of American prisoners of war from Hanoi.

As airlift operations at CCK began to wind down, the 374th Wing and its flying squadrons moved to Clark Air Base
in November 1973 and it was replaced as the CCK support unit by the 6217th Combat Support Group. The group was later renamed the 6217th Tactical Group to reflect its mission of controlling deployed fighter units at CCK. In May 1975, F-4 fighter units withdrew from CCK Air Base to Kadena Air Base. In June 1975, preparations began to close CCK and the group was replaced by the 6217th Air Base Squadron, which managed the disposition of Air Force assets as the base shut down.

Although no official announcement had been made connecting these changes with the revised China policy of the United States, these reductions reflected that soon after the Shanghai Communiqué was issued in 1972, steps began to reduce the United States military presence in Taiwan with the ultimate objective of withdrawing all personnel and closing all bases. The division was inactivated on 7 January 1976.

Lineage
 Constituted as the 327th Air Division on 22 June 1957
 Activated on 1 July 1957
 Discontinued on 8 March 1960
 Organized on 8 February 1966
 Inactivated on 7 January 1976

Assignments
 Thirteenth Air Force, 1 July 1957 – 8 March 1960
 Thirteenth Air Force, 8 February 1966 – 7 January 1976

Components
Wings
 314th Troop Carrier Wing (later 314th Tactical Airlift Wing), (attached 8 February 1966 – 1 November 1968, assigned 1 November 1968 – 31 May 1971)
 Ching Chuan Kang Air Base
 374th Tactical Airlift Wing: 31 May 1971 – 15 November 1973
 Ching Chuan Kang Air Base

Groups
 6214th Combat Support Group (later 6214th Air Base Group, 6214th Air Base Squadron): 8 February 1966 – 31 May 1975
 Tainan Air Station
 6217th Combat Support Group: 8 February 1966 – 31 May 1968
 Ching Chuan Kang Air Base
 6217th Combat Support Group (later 6217 Tactical Group): 15 November 1973 – 31 May 1975
 Ching Chuan Kang Air Base
Squadrons
 41st Fighter-Interceptor Squadron: 1 October 1957 – 8 March 1960
 852d Aircraft Control and Warning Squadron: 1 July 1957 – 8 March 1960
 Operated at Mount Santa Rosa
 6213th Support Squadron (later 6213th Air Base Squadron): 8 February 1966 – 7 January 1976
 6214th Air Base Squadron: See 6214th Combat Support Group
 6215th Support Squadron: 8 February 1966 – 7 January 1976
 Chiayi Air Base
 6217th Air Base Squadron: 31 May 1975 – 7 January 1976
 Ching Chuan Kang Air Base

Other
 USAF Dispensary, Taipei (later USAF Clinic, Taipei): 17 May 1971 – 1 April 1973
 6205th Tactical Control Flight: 30 September 1971 – 30 June 1972

Stations
 Andersen Air Force Base, Guam, 1 July 1957 – 8 March 1960
 Taipei Air Station, Taiwan, 8 February 1966 – 7 January 1976

Aircraft
 North American F-86D Sabre, 1957–1960
 Lockheed C-130 Hercules, 1966–1973
 Douglas C-47 Skytrain, 1971–1972
 Douglas C-54 Skymaster, 1971–1972
 McDonnell Douglas F-4 Phantom II, 1970–1975

See also
 List of Douglas C-47 Skytrain operators
 List of Lockheed C-130 Hercules operators
 List of Sabre and Fury units in the US military
 List of United States Air Force air divisions
 United States Taiwan Defense Command

References

Notes
 Explanatory notes

 Citations

Bibliography

 
 

Air divisions of the United States Air Force
United States military in Taiwan